Strand Street is one of the main streets in the central business district of Cape Town, South Africa. It runs northwest-southeast through the centre from Green Point to Woodstock, passing the Golden Acre shopping centre, the Cape Town railway station, the Lutheran Church in Strand Street, the Koopmans-de Wet House, and the Castle of Good Hope. Originally, in the vicinity of the Castle, Strand Street ran along the Table Bay shore - "strand" being the Dutch and Afrikaans word for "beach" - but land reclamation to create the Foreshore and the modern Port of Cape Town has moved the shoreline about a kilometre to the northeast.

East of the city centre, Strand Street passes under the N2 freeway, to which it is connected by ramps. It continues as New Market Street and then Albert Street, eventually becoming Voortrekker Road, the original road route from Cape Town to Bellville and the interior. West of the centre it becomes High Level Road to Sea Point.

See also 
 Koopmans-de Wet House
 Grand Parade
 Lutheran Church in Strand Street

References 

Streets in Cape Town